Volodymyr Petrovych Shcherban (born 26 January 1950) is a Ukrainian politician and governor of a number of regions in Ukraine. He is sometimes confused with another Ukrainian politician, Yevhen Shcherban.

Brief biography
Shcherban was born in the town of Artemivsk, Perevalsk Raion (Voroshilovhrad Oblast) on January 26, 1950. After finishing school, in 1967 he went to work for the Tochmash Factory in Donetsk as apprentice to a locksmith. From 1969 to 1971 Shcherban served in the army. Afterwards, he returned to Tochmash where he worked as a locksmith from 1971 to 1972. From 1972 to 1976 Shcherban studied at the Donetsk Institute of Soviet Trade. From 1976 to 1979 he worked for the fruit and vegetable farms of the Chernivtsi regional department of retail. Later he worked in a number of retail institutions in Donetsk.

In 1990 Shcherban was elected to the Donetsk city council. From 1992 to 1994 he was a deputy mayor in Donetsk and from 1994 to 1996 chairman of the Donetsk Oblast council. Shcherban was also elected to the Verkhovna Rada from the Budyonnivsky electoral district N107 (Donetsk Oblast). In the parliament he was a member of the Social-Market Choice faction and the Budget Committee. He served as a People's Deputy of Ukraine at the second convocation until 1998. At the same time, from 1995 to 1996, Shcherban was appointed the governor of Donetsk Oblast and was an acting governor of Sumy Oblast from 1994 to 1996, completely ignoring the fact of unlawful conduct by working as legislator and government official.

As a member of the Liberal Party of Ukraine (LPU), Shcherban was elected once again from the Donetsk region electoral district N41 in 1998, joining the parliamentary group the Independents. In March 1999 he was appointed the governor of Sumy Oblast, a position which he held until 2002. In September 1999 Shcherban finally resigned as a member of parliament. In 2002, he again was elected to the parliament as a member of the LPU within the electoral bloc Our Ukraine N44 on a party list. Soon after being elected, Shcherban joined the For United Ukraine parliamentary faction for a short time (the faction was dissolved) and then People's Choice. In June 2003 he resigned as a member of parliament, being appointed the governor of Sumy Oblast one more time.

After the Orange Revolution in the beginning of 2005, Volodymyr Shcherban fled from Ukraine to the United States and ended up in Orlando and later Boca Raton, both in Florida. In Ukraine he was charged with a number of serious crimes such as abuse of an official post, abuse of power, extortion, fraud of financial resources, hindering the exercise of electoral rights, and others.  Shcherban, however, was detained in October 2005 on expired visa charges and placed in an immigration prison near Miami, but was released on $2 million bail. 

While in Florida, Shcherban was caught up in controversy by attending a $500-a-plate fundraiser for gubernatorial candidate Charlie Crist hosted by Donald Trump, which constituted an illegal campaign contribution. At the request of Ukrainian authorities, he was extradited back to Ukraine. In November 2006, representatives of the General Prosecutor Office of Ukraine detained Shcherban at Boryspil International Airport, but after a few days he was allowed to go home.

Family
 Wife – Iryna, chairman of the Vichnist (Eternity) charity fund in Sumy Oblast.
 Son – Artem, member of parliament (Party of Regions), owner of the Gefest network of gas stations that once belonged to Yevhen Shcherban

1996 murder case
Both Shcherbans were business and political partners in the past. However, Serhiy Vlasenko notes that in the fall of 1996 there was a conflict between the two of them as Yevhen Shcherban reconsidered his political plans and intended to align himself with Yevhen Marchuk to pursue further political goals. Vlasenko also stated that two days after the murder, there was a funds transfer of over $2 million from the accounts of the American company belonging to Nadia Nikitina (wife of Yevhen Shcherban) to the accounts of the American company belonging to Artem Shcherban (son of Volodymyr Shcherban). Soon thereafter, member of parliament Vlasenko was stripped of his legislative mandate by the Higher Administrative Court of Ukraine (VASU).

In an interview with journalist Yevhen Yevhovych Shcherban (junior) of Mirror Weekly on September 22, 1997, soon after surviving another murder attempt, he stated that neither the former (Volodymyr Shcherban) or current governors (Viktor Yanukovych) of Donetsk Oblast, nor the mayor of Donetsk (Volodymyr Rybak) helped him and his brother after the murder of their father.

Bread factories
At the end of 2011, Shcherban sold his bread factory in Lebedyn to local entrepreneur Oleksandr Marchenko. In addition, Shcherban also listed his factories in Okhtyrka and Hlukhiv (note: all in the Sumy Oblast) for sale. He also sold just over half of the controlling stock in another bread factory in Konotop to Party of Regions politician Vitaliy Khomutynnik in 2008.

References

External links
 Profile at Liga.net

1950 births
People from Luhansk Oblast
Second convocation members of the Verkhovna Rada
Third convocation members of the Verkhovna Rada
Fourth convocation members of the Verkhovna Rada
Liberal Party of Ukraine politicians
Prisoners and detainees of the United States federal government
Ukrainian people imprisoned abroad
Governors of Sumy Oblast
Governors of Donetsk Oblast
Living people
Laureates of the State Prize of Ukraine in the Field of Architecture